The Royal and Hashemite Order of the Pearl is the dynastic order of the Royal House of Sulu, which serves as the premier institution and the highest personal honour of and in the Royal Sultanate of Sulu. The order is an honourable and nobiliary corporation instituted as a dynastic Order of Datuship analogous to traditional dynastic orders of chivalry, and is in direct continuation from the ancient customs and distinctions of the Royal Sultanate of Sulu and the Court of the Sultan. Ampun Sultan Muedzul Lail Tan Kiram, as  Head of the Royal House of Sulu, is the hereditary sovereign who processes the fons honorum and Grand Sayyid of the order, and his heirs and successors as heads of the Royal House of Sulu, shall ever be sovereigns and Grand Sayyids of the order.

Original founding
In his care for preservation of the ancient customs of the Sultanate and the values of the nation, Ampun Sultan Muedzul Lail Tan Kiram in 2011 used his sovereignty right of fons honorum to create an Order, thus developing the traditional honours of the Royal court in a form accepted internationally. 

The Sultan is formally recognised at the national level as in 1974, the Philippine government had officially recognised the continued existence of the Royal Sultanate of Sulu and the Sultan as the legitimate heir.

Membership

Membership within the Order is conferred upon those who have performed worthy and meritorious service of an exceptional level for the Royal House of Sulu; upon those of any nationality who, in any field of endeavour, have become distinguished and respected figures of international renown by virtue of their celebrated activities; and upon those who have performed loyal and faithful service to the Royal House and its members. 

The grades of the Order are: 
  Royal Companion (RCPS)
  Grand Cordon (GCPS)
  Distinguished Companion (DCPS)
  Companion (CPS)
  Officer (OPS)
  Member (MPS)

Notable members

Some of the more notable people who have accepted membership in the Order of the Pearl are:
 Hussin Ututalum Amin, Mayor of Jolo
 Duarte Pio, Duke of Braganza
 Mwami Yuhi VI of Rwanda
 Mwami Kigeli V Ndahindurwa of Rwanda
 Archduke Karl von Habsburg
 Prince Alexandar Pavlov Karageorgevich of Serbia and Yugoslavia
 Princess Jelisaveta Karageorgevich of Serbia and Yugoslavia
 Rukirabasaija Agutamba Solomon Gafabusa Iguru I, Omukama of Bunyoro-Kitara (Uganda)
 Crown Prince Davit Bagrationi Mukhran Batonishvili of Georgia
 Prince Ermias Sahle-Selassie, Imperial Prince of Ethiopia
 Togbe Osei III of Godenu 
 Owana Salazar of Hawaii
 Reverend Professor Noel Cox
 Lech Wałęsa

Heraldry
Members of the Order have specific heraldic regulations related to how to display their insignia with their coat of arms. Permission to display their insignia is granted via the office of the Gateway Chronicler King of Arms that also regulates all heraldry for the Royal House of Sulu.

Specifically, these are the rules:
 Members of the paramount class of the Pearl Collar may encircle their arms with the Collar of the Order. If, for some exceptional reasons, the specific oval badge and riband of this grade are displayed instead of the Collar, a golden flame may be added above the badge.
 Members of the class of the Grand Cordon may adorn their shield with the Order's crowned badge and display the riband of the Order fastened with a bow from which the badge is suspended, whereas the riband may encircle the shield either completely or partially.
 Members of the class of the Distinguished Companion may adorn their shield with the Order's crowned badge and display the ribbon of the Order, each half displayed separately, whereas the ribbon may encircle the shield either completely or partially. The ribbon may be shown with loose ends issuant from behind the shield and may display a flame above the insignia and is entitled to the Order's star.
 Members of the class of the Companion may adorn their shield with the Order's crowned badge and display the ribbon of the Order, each half displayed separately, whereas the ribbon may encircle the shield either completely or partially. The ribbon may be shown with loose ends issuant from behind the shield. Membership in this grade does not entitle members to supporters.
 Members of the class of the Officer may adorn their shield with the Order's crowned badge and display the ribbon of the Order, one half displayed covering the other. The ribbon is issuant from beneath the shield with optionally loose ends shown issuant from behind the shield. Optionally, the buckle may be shown above the ribbon. Membership in this grade does not entitle members to supporters.
 Members of the class of the Member may adorn their shield with the Order's uncrowned badge and display the ribbon of the Order, one half displayed covering the other. The ribbon is issuant from beneath the shield with optionally loose ends shown issuant from behind the shield. Optionally, the buckle may be shown above the ribbon. Membership in this grade does not entitle members to supporters.

Those in the two senior most ranks are entitled to supporters in a way of grant or of certification. A widow of a companion who did not obtain supporters but was entitled to them, may apply in his name.

Honorific Title 
No specific courtesy titles are awarded to Members of the Order but those belonging in the upper class who are either a Distinguished Companion or a Grand Cordon are permitted to use conventional honorific titles such as "The Honourable" or "Excellency". Royal Companion Members normally have their own customary titles of nobility but some notable members may also be awarded the senior nobility title of "Datu Sadja" which is exclusively granted by the Sultan. Conferring of customary titles is protected under the Rules and Regulations of the Indigenous Peoples Rights Act of 1997.

External links
 Official site of the Royal and Hashemite Order of the Pearl
 Sultanate of Sulu: Notes from the Past and Present Times article by Aleksandar Backo

References

Dynastic orders